Caladenia anthracina, commonly known as the black-tipped spider orchid, is a plant in the orchid family Orchidaceae and is endemic to Tasmania. It is a ground orchid with a single hairy leaf and a single white or cream-coloured flower with red markings and black tips on the sepals and petals.

Description
Caladenia anthracina is a terrestrial, perennial, deciduous, herb with an underground tuber surrounded by a fibrous covering.

It is white to cream-coloured and there are four to six rows of dark reddish-purple calli along in the centre part and short, blunt teeth along the edge. Flowering occurs between late September and early November.

Taxonomy and naming
The species was first formally described by David L. Jones in 1998 and the description was published in Australian Orchid Research from a specimen collected near Ross. The specific epithet (anthracina) is a Latin word meaning "coal-black" referring to the glands on the ends of the sepals and petals.

Distribution and habitat

Conservation
This species is classified as "Endangered"  by the Tasmanian government and is listed as "critically endangered" (CR) under the Environment Protection and Biodiversity Conservation Act 1999 (EPBC Act).

References

anthracina
Plants described in 1998
Endemic orchids of Australia
Orchids of Tasmania
Taxa named by David L. Jones (botanist)